David Thomson Pearson (9 November 1932 – July 2019), was a Scottish footballer who played as an inside forward in the English Football League. Dave scored a hat-trick on his Oldham Athletic debut

External links

Dave Pearson

1932 births
2019 deaths
Scottish footballers
Footballers from Dunfermline
Association football forwards
Blackburn Rovers F.C. players
Ipswich Town F.C. players
Darwen F.C. players
Oldham Athletic A.F.C. players
Rochdale A.F.C. players
Crewe Alexandra F.C. players
Chorley F.C. players
English Football League players